Sis is a car / passenger ferry owned and operated by Jadrolinija in Croatia, where she operates between Zadar and the island of Ugljan. The vessel was previously known as Netley Castle when operated by Red Funnel on services to the Isle of Wight in the UK.

History

Sis was ordered from Ryton Marine in 1972 as Netley Castle for Red Funnel. The ship was launched on 23 November 1973 and after finishing work, trials and modifications entered service 24 June 1974. She was sold to Jadrolinija and left Southampton on 24 January 1997 to transfer to Zadar, stopping at Gibraltar on 2 February.

Design
The ferry is double ended and to support this has two bridges, one at either end of the ship's superstructure. This allows true drive through operation on both legs of the route.  Her predecessors were more conventional, which involved two reversals on one leg of the crossing. This added significant time to the journey, meaning the timetable was unbalanced. The ship had a side ramp on the south side, as seen in the photograph, to allow cars to be landed or embarked from the pontoon at West Cowes.  This service ceased in the mid-1980s.

She is powered by four Caterpillar D379 diesel engines, each one driving an Aquamaster Z-drive which can provide thrust through 360º, eliminating the need for a conventional rudder and making her very manoeuvrable.

Incidents
On 30 November 1975, she collided with the sea wall at Cowes in thick fog.

Just before Easter 1983 she lost power approaching Town Quay and collided with another vessel moored at the quay. This necessitated urgent repairs at Husbands' shipyard at Marchwood to get her back into service for the Easter rush.

References

External links
 Simplon Postcards

Ferries of Croatia
Ships built on the River Tyne
1973 ships
Ships of Red Funnel